Gromoshikha is a rural locality (a village) in Lentyevskoye Rural Settlement, Ustyuzhensky District, Vologda Oblast, Russia. The population was 96 as of 2002. There are 4 streets.

Geography 
Imeni Zhelyabova is the nearest rural locality.

References 

Rural localities in Ustyuzhensky District